Events in the year 1740 in Japan.

Incumbents
Monarch: Sakuramachi

Births
September 23 - Empress Go-Sakuramachi (d. 1813)

 
1740s in Japan
Japan
Years of the 18th century in Japan